Stygian refers to the River Styx of the underworld in Greek mythology.

Stygia or Stygian may also refer to:

Animal kingdom 
 Stygia (moth), a genus of moth
 Stygian owl (Asio stygius), a species of owl
 Stygian ringlet (Erebia styx), a butterfly belonging to the subfamily Satyrinae

Fiction 
 Stygia (Conan), a setting among the fictional realms of Conan the Barbarian
 Stygian Witches, name used in Clash of Titans films for the three Graeae of Greek mythology
 Stygian Penal Colony, a maximum security prison used by the Multiverse Authority in The One
 Stygian Iron, an iron sword from  the Rick Riordan novels
 A giant worm and core boss in the Fantasy action video game Darksiders
 The highest difficulty in the video game Darkest Dungeon
 Stygian, a 2000 film, the directorial debut of James Wan
 Stygian, also known as the Pony of Shadows, a character in My Little Pony: Friendship Is Magic

Others 
 Stygian Cove, in the South Orkney Islands
 Stygian Software; see Underrail
 Stygian Vistas, a 1997 EP by Soma
 , an S-class submarine of the Royal Navy
 Stygian blue, a deeply saturated blue-black impossible color
 "Travel in Stygian", a song by the band Iced Earth
 " Scribes of the Stygian", a song by the band Incantation (band)

See also
 Styx River (disambiguation)
 Styx (disambiguation)